Chalton may refer to:

Chalton, Bedfordshire, England
Chalton, Hampshire, England

See also
Charlton (disambiguation)